This is a list of Bien de Interés Cultural landmarks in the Province of Palencia, Spain.

 Castle of Torremormojón
 San Martín de Tours de Frómista
 San Salvador de Nogal de las Huertas

References 

 
Palencia